E-One Moli Energy Corp. is a Taiwanese manufacturer of lithium-ion batteries. It was founded in 1998 and focused on producing high capacity energy cells for notebook computers, high-end electronics and networking communication devices under the "Molicel" brand.

In 2004, it partnered with Milwaukee Electric Tool to develop a high energy power cell for cordless power tools, with its first power tool model introduced in 2005. It has also provided batteries to Ford for electric cars, and in 2008 became the first qualified battery supplier for BMW MINI E.

Its E-One Moli Energy (Canada) Limited division has a facility in Maple Ridge, British Columbia that is the only North American high volume manufacturer of rechargeable lithium-ion batteries. It has been listed by the Critical Foreign Dependencies Initiative as a result.

History 
The history of E-One Moli Energy goes back to Moli Energy Ltd., the Canadian pioneer of rechargeable lithium battery technology, founded in 1977 in the Greater Vancouver suburb of Burnaby. Moli Energy went into receivership after a cell phone battery produced by the company caught fire in 1989, resulting in its sales being halted and tens of thousands of phones getting recalled. The failure of Moli's battery technology caused a shift towards safer intercalation electrode materials.

The company was then acquired by "a consortium of Japanese tech companies" for CAD 5 million in a deal with the British Columbia government.   The deal was criticized for being far below the value of Moli's patents. In 1994 the company became Nippon Moli Energy Corp. and in 1997 it became NEC Moli Energy Corp. In 1998 it merged with Taiwanese E-One Technology forming the current E-One Moli Energy Corp.

References

Energy companies established in 1998
Lithium-ion batteries
Manufacturing companies established in 1998
Manufacturing companies based in Taipei
Taiwanese companies established in 1998